BMX racing is a type of off-road bicycle racing. The format of BMX was derived from motocross racing. BMX bicycle races are sprint races on purpose-built off-road single-lap race tracks. The track usually consists of a starting gate for up to eight racers, a groomed, serpentine, dirt race course made of various jumps and rollers and a finish line.
The sport of BMX racing is facilitated by a number of regional and international sanctioning bodies. They provide rules for sanctioning the conduct of the flying, specify age group and skill-level classifications among the racers, and maintain some kind of points-accumulation system over the racing season. The sport is very family oriented and largely participant-driven, with riders ranging in age from 2 to 70, and over. Professional ranks exist for both men and women, where the age ranges from 17 to over 40 years old.

History

While informal bicycle racing existed to different extents, it was in Southern California that the sport of BMX started to become organized and resemble the modern sport. Original influencers included Ron Mackler, who was a park attendant in Santa Monica and set up races at Palms Park in West Los Angeles in 1969. Mackler, a teenager with motocross experience helped organize local boys who wanted to race. The first race took place on July 10, 1969. Four years later, in 1973, back-to-back seasons of ten weeks in duration were established with an entrance fee of $4.50. The track ran through the southeast areas of the park with variations in topography; the track remained relatively unchanged through 1980.

Bikes sizes
There are two BMX racing bikes sizes. One is the 20" wheel bike. This bike is currently the most common class. The 20" wheel bikes are referred to as "Class" bikes. The second type is "Cruiser" bikes which are any bikes with an outer tire diameter of 22.5". The most common cruiser size uses a 24" wheel. The cruiser style bike tends to be easier to jump and rolls smoother while the 20" is more agile.

Advantages
While BMX racing is an individual sport, teams are often formed from racers in different classifications for camaraderie and for business exposure of a sponsoring organization or company. BMX racing rewards strength, quickness, and bike handling. Many successful BMX racers have gone on to leverage their skills in other forms of bicycle and motorcycle competitions.

Track features
There are many types of BMX jumps, ranging from small rollers to massive step-up doubles. There are pro straights for professional racers which are doubles that range from about 6 m to 12 m, while "Class" straights have more flow and have many more range of jumps.

The Start Gate

The start gate marks the start of the track. Most BMX tracks have a gate. The starting hill will normally provide all the speed for the remainder of the race. Generally, the larger the hill, the faster, so pro hills are much larger than the amateur ones.

Step-up

A step-up jump is one where the landing point is at a higher elevation than the take-off point.

Berms

Turns which are at an angle. Therefore, one can easily turn without having to brake.

Double

A double is two hills close enough to each other that it is possible to jump between them.

Step-down

A step-down jump is one where the landing point is at a lower elevation than the take-off point.

Roller

A small hill, generally too low to be jumped off.  Rollers are normally built in groups that are known as rhythm sections because they challenge the riders' ability to maintain speed over the bumps.

Tabletop

A tabletop is a jump where the track is level across between the take-off and landing points.  They are especially useful for beginning BMX riders who are still learning how to jump since a too-short jump will land on the level tabletop rather than slamming into the uphill side of the landing hill.

Pro set

A set of jumps with only a takeoff lip and a landing ramp, that is, where a failure to take-off or to jump far enough will result in a crash.

Olympics
BMX racing became a medal sport at the 2008 Summer Olympics in Beijing under the UCI sanctioning body. The Sanctioning body of the United States is USA BMX. USA BMX is certified under the UCI (International Cycling Union), which is recognized by the Olympic Committee.

Sanctioning bodies
A sanctioning body is a private (in the United States and most Western Nations) governing body which controls a sport or specific discipline thereof. One or more sanctioning bodies may operate in a sport at any given time, often with subtle rule variations which appeal to regional tastes. They make and enforce the rules, and decide the qualifications and responsibilities of the participants, including the players, owners, and operators of facilities. In legal terms, they are an intermediary between the participants and higher governing bodies such as (in cycling) the Union Cycliste Internationale (UCI) and National Governing Bodies such as USA Cycling. Sanctioning bodies mete out discipline and punishments, as well as bestow awards and rankings of their participants.

In the Bicycle Motocross context, sanctioning bodies are chiefly responsible for providing insurance coverage and other "back office" services to local tracks. They also keep points on riders' performance throughout the year, and undertake the production of a national racing series (which is typically 18-22 weekends per year). Riders are permitted to race at the sanctioning body's affiliated tracks and national events via the purchase of an annual membership which costs (in the US) US$60. As part of their administrative "service provider" role, BMX sanctioning bodies also determine the rules of competition, such as clothing requirements, age and gender divisions (or "classes"), as well as the rules and protocol for advancement in proficiency classes (Novice, Intermediate, Expert, Girl Expert, Cruiser, Girl Cruiser, Vet Pro, Men/Women Junior, and Men/Women Pro.)

BMX Racing has had many sanctioning bodies over its 40-year history as an organized sport, the first being Scot Breithaupt's Bicycle United Motocross Society (BUMS), created in the early 1970s (see below). Since then, there have been dozens of regional, national, and international sanctioning bodies, some of them associated with or owned by another. Most are defunct or have been merged into larger, more successful organizations, but a handful still exist in their original forms and are prospering.

In the United States, USA BMX is the main sanctioning body which was formed in 2011 from the merger of the two largest organizations, the ABA and NBL.

Australia

Australian Bicycle Motocross Association (ABMXA)
Two ABMXA sanctioning bodies that formed in the history of BMX in Australia:

The first one was formed in May 1975 by Bob Smith, an Australian businessman and two of his friends. He open the first BMX track in Australia on May 17, 1975, on the Gold Coast in Tallebudgera, Queensland adjacent to the Tally Valley Golf Club. He had admired BMX through the American magazines his son brought home.

The second ABMXA was formed in April 1981 from three regional Australian BMX organizations: The Victoria BMX Association; (VBMXA), the Queensland BMX Association (QBMXA) and the New South Wales BMX Association (NSWBMXA). It was Australia's representative to the IBMXF in the 1980s.

National Bicycle Association (NBA)

The National Bicycle Association was a third, separate Australian sanctioning body. It was formed in December 1981 and had branches in different countries around the world. By the summer of 1982 it had 20,000 members worldwide and 950 members in the Australian states of Victoria and New South Wales. Despite sharing a common name this association had nothing to do with the original United States–based National Bicycle Association that was formed in California in 1974 and ironically merged with the National Bicycle League and ceased operations as an independent body in December 1981, the same month and year the Australian namesake was formed.

Bicycle Motocross Australia (BMXA)
BMX Australia (BMXA) is the current sanctioning body for BMX in Australia.

Canada
Cycling Canada Cyclism (CCC)
BMX Canada

Currently - Cycling Canada http://www.cyclingcanada.ca/ is the Federal Sanctioning body for all Canadian cycling disciplines (including BMX) under the UCI.
Some tracks and Provinces have chosen BMX Canada over the Provincial UCI representative. Here are the different choices that are available in Canada,

Alberta - ABA -Alberta BMX Association. http://www.albertabmx.com/

British Columbia - Cycling BC. http://cyclingbc.net/bmx/

Saskatchewan - http://www.saskcycling.ca/BMX.html

Quebec - http://www.fqsc.net/BMX

All Ontario tracks and some BC tracks are sanctioned by an American corporation - USA BMX (also known as ABA) under the assumed name BMX Canada - http://www.bmxcanada.org
These tracks run rules separate from the UCI but offer similar race structure and age categorization. BMX Canada offers full support to their affiliated tracks, including point tracking, marketing materials, an in-house magazine and a coaching/retention program. Results from these races run under the USA BMX/BMX Canada name are used in the team selection process for Provincial and National teams.

France

Fédération Française de Bicrossing (FFB)
La Fédération Française de Bicrossing, which in English translates to The French Federation of Bicrossing (FFB) was created on March 1, 1978, by Marcelle Seurat, a motorcycle importer and distributor. At first its primary purpose was to promote BMX and its products On May 17, 1980, it held is first race in Beaune, France. This organization would cease to exist in early 1981 after only acquiring 100 members.

Association Française de Bicrossing (AFdB)
L'Association Française de Bicrossing, which in English translates to the French Association of Bicrossing (FAB), was founded by Raymond Imbert, Rene Nicolas, Denis Mourier, Bernard Nicolas, Fabrice Pérez, Gerard Hinault and Pascal Giboulot on March 1, 1981.

Fédération Française de Cyclisme (FFC)
On January 1, 1990, the AFdB joined the FFC. On March 4, 1993, BMX was recognized as an important sport by the French Ministry for sports. Today the official French BMX Sanctioning body is now the Fédération Française de Cyclisme (FFC), or in English the French Cycling Federation (FCF). It has almost 10,000 members.

Italy

Associazione Italiana BMX (A.I.BMX)
The Associazione Italiana BMX, which in English translates to Italian BMX Association, was founded in December 1981 by Aldo Gandolfo, an Italian journalist and sport promoter. In 1983 the A.I.BMX joined the I.BMX.F. and held the first official Italian BMX race. In 1984, the A.I.BMX held the first Italian international race in Pinerolo and organized the first Italian participation in European Championships. In 1985 Galdolfo left the Association, which was refounded with a new statute and a new board of directors. In 1988 the A.I.BMX concluded an agreement with the UISP in order to unify their respective national championships and in 1989 ceased the activity.

Unione Italiana Sport per Tutti (UISP)
The Unione Italiana Sport per Tutti, which in English translates to Italian Sport For All Association, is an amateur sport association which conducted an official BMX racing activity from 1985 to 1990, mainly developed in Piedmont and Emilia-Romagna. In 1988 concluded an agreement with the A.I.BMX in order to unify their respective national championships and in 1991 ceased the BMX activity.

Federazione Ciclistica Italiana
The Federazione Ciclistica Italiana (FCI), which in English translates to Italian Cycling Federation, is the national governing body of cycle racing in Italy and started conducting official BMX activity in 1984. It was a big promoter of BMX racing within the Fédération Internationale Amateur de Cyclisme (FIAC) and in 1985 held the first FIAC World Championship in Jesolo (near Venice). Every year the FCI organize the National Championship (held in a single race normally on the first Sunday of July) and a season-long competition called Circuito Italiano BMX (seven rounds in 2008, with the same point system as the UEC European Championship) open to Italian and foreign riders.

Japan
Japan Bicycle Motocross Association (JBA)

Netherlands

Stichting Fietscross Nederland (SFN)
The first sanctioning body in the Netherlands was called the Stichting Fietscross Nederland (SFN) (in English the Dutch Bicycle Motocross Foundation (DBMXF)) and was co-founded on October 19, 1978, by Gerrit Does and Louis Vrijdag. It held its first race on April 21, 1979. In December 1980 it was folded into the KNWU (see below) but a second incarnation was created in 1987 called the Stichting Fietscross Promotie Nederland (the Dutch BMX Promotion Foundation) to promote Dutch racing in the Netherlands. This second "SFN" was dissolved in 1997.

Koninklijke Nederlandsche Wielren Unie (KNWU)
On December 16, 1980, the SFN was integrated into the Koninklijke Nederlandsche Wielren Unie (KNWU) (in English the Royal Dutch Cycling Federation (RDCF)), the Dutch cycling sanctioning body that was the governing body for all types of cycling and represents the Netherlands as a member of the UCI.

Nederlandse Fietscross Federatie (NFF)
Some of the then-existing local tracks in 1980 did not become a member of the KNWU. Operating for a while independently, they formed another sanctioning body in 1987, the Nederlandse Fietscross Federatie (NFF), (in English the Dutch Bicycle Motocross Federation (DBMXF)).

Both organizations function as sanctioning bodies for BMX racing.

New Zealand

BMX New Zealand Incorporated (BMXNZ) is the recognised National Sporting Organisation (NSO) for BMX racing in New Zealand. It is a founding Member Organisation of Cycling New Zealand (CNZ) the National Federation for cycling in New Zealand. BMXNZ has a membership of 32 clubs (as of January 2017) based in seven regions.

United Kingdom

United kingdom bicycle motocross association (UKBMXA)
The UKBMXA was created in April 1980 by David Duffield as first as a way of promoting BMX in England. On August 30, 1980, it held its first BMX race in Redditch, England.  This sanctioning body would later become affiliated with the IBMXF and represent England in the IBMXF sanctioned events including the European and World Championships. In the summer of 1985 it merged with the National Bicycle Motocross Association (NBMXA) with the UKBMXA being the dominant partner with its name carrying on.

National Bicycle Motocross Association (NBMXA)
The National Bicycle Motocross Association was a British sanctioning body headquartered in Ashton in Makersfield, Wigan England.

English Bicycle Association (EBA)

In November 1989 UKBMX Association (UKBMXA) and the British BMX Association (BBMXA) merged and formed the English Bicycle Association (EBA). This combination would represent England in the IBMXF.

British Cycling

The EBA merged with the British Cycling Federation (BCF) which had represented all other aspects and disciplines of English bicycle racing other than BMX. This organization is now known as British Cycling. British Cycling now represents all aspects of sport cycling in the United Kingdom including BMX within the UCI.

It is not to be confused with the now-defunct United States–based National Bicycle Motocross Association (NBmxA) (1972–1981) that was formerly known as the National Bicycle Association (NBA) and was the first BMX sanctioning body in the world. The British NBMXA ceased operations in the summer of 1985.

United States
On July 10, 1969, a group of boys riding their Schwinn Sting-Ray bicycles in Palms Park in West Los Angeles wanted to race. A park attendant, Ronald Mackler, a teenager with motorcycle motocross (MX) experience, helped them organize. Palms Park became to BMX as Elysian Fields is to American baseball, for at that moment Bicycle Motocross racing was born. By 1973, entrance fees of US$4.50 (which included a US$1.00 insurance fee for the year) for a 10-week season of Thursday-night racing was charged, and the top three racers in the season were given trophies. Then a new season of 10 weeks would start the following Thursday.

The track operated well into the 1980s largely unchanged;, including the lack of a modern starting gate.

Bicycle United Motocross Society (BUMS)

The first BMX proto sanctioning body was the Bicycle United Motocross Society (BUMS) founded by Scot Breithaupt in Long Beach, California on November 14, 1970, when he was fourteen years old. On that day he put on his first ad hoc BMX race. At first BUMS simply referred to the transients that congregated in the field around 7th and Bellflower Streets where the track was located, but later Scot turned it into the acronym BUMS. The first race had 35 participants, who paid Scot a quarter (US25 cents) each for the privilege. At the next race 150 kids showed up.

Since Scot was a motorcycle racer, he knew even at thirteen the importance of a sanctioning body and how races were run and organized. He used his personal trophies that he won racing motocross motorcycles as awards for the winning competitors. He gave out membership cards, wrote the rulebook, and had a points system for scoring and proficiency level promotion. He ran the first state championship in 1972, when he was all of 16 years old. Also due to his racing experience, he knew how to lay out a particularly exciting course. It was more akin to what the professionals race on in special Pro sections of track at large events today, including water holes and high dropoffs. Indeed, this early track resembled more closely a shortened mountain biking course than today's comparatively well groomed BMX tracks. With the aforementioned exception of pro sections, today's tracks for the most part are pretty tame by comparison due to insurance concerns by the sanctioning bodies. The National Bicycle League even went so far as to ban double jumps in 1988.

This first structured sanctioning body would eventually grow to seven tracks in California. This is what made him different from other track operators at the time: he did not just start one track but several others under a single jurisdiction of rules and regulations, all the requirements of a sanctioning body.

Among the firsts credited to BUMS was the first professional race in 1975 at Saddleback Park with a US$200 purse. Breithaupt also promoted in a joint venture with the new National Bicycle Association (NBA) (which was established the year before) what would later be called "Nationals" with the Yamaha Bicycle Gold Cup series in 1974. They were three separate qualifying races held at three separate tracks in California sponsored and heavily promoted by Yamaha Motor Company Ltd. to decide the first "National" No. 1 racer at a fourth and final race at the Los Angeles Coliseum. It was an achievement of import in the infancy of BMX, but it was not a true national since virtually all the events were held in California and almost all racers were Californians. It would be left for other innovators to create a true national event.

National Bicycle Association (NBA)

Many followed Ronald Mackler, Rich Lee and Scot Breithaupt, opening impromptu often short-lived tracks sometimes within preexisting Motorcycle Motocross tracks; but with the exception of Breithaupt, the operators were independent "organizations" that operated individual tracks without any cohesion. What was needed was a governing body that would standardize and give direction and purpose to the grab bag of these amateur-run (in that these operators did not have this enterprise as the main concern of their lives) tracks.

The first official BMX sanctioning body was the National Bicycle Association (NBA) started by Ernie Alexander in 1972. Like Scot Breithaupt, he had motorcycle motocross in his background, and like Scot he was a promoter but a professional one with his American Cycle Enterprises (ACE). He was also a former Hollywood stunt man who promoted races at the famous Indian Dunes, built and managed by Walt James, where many movies and TV shows were filmed. In 1970 he noticed a group of kids trying to organize a bicycle race with their Schwinn Sting-Rays. Being familiar with motorcycle racing, he lent the kids a hand. He later opened the Yarnell track, a steep downhill course every bit as treacherous by today's standards as Scot Breithaupt's BUMS track—if not more so. In 1972 he created the National Bicycle Association, modeled on the existing American Motorcycle Association (AMA). It was Mr. Alexander who built a truly nation-spanning professional sanctioning body for BMX.

Mismanagement irreparably damaged its reputation, including such practices as not reporting points totals in time, running races late and behind schedule, deliberately scheduling its own events opposite the events of other sanctioning bodies to weaken their attendance, and a less-than-attentive attitude to members. In its last two years it went through a name change to National BMX Association (NBmxA) in 1979. It tried to reorganize in 1981, starting new tracks and by most accounts had a spark of new energy and enthusiasm, but still suffered lack of ridership (racers were committed to other point races with the other sanctioning bodies). This was to no avail. The NBA, suffering financial difficulties, ceased sanctioning its own races and started joint operations and did merge its membership (but did not merge its management) with the NBL after the 1981 season.

Mr. Alexander did try at least one more foray into the sport he helped to pioneer: he started the World Wide Bicycle Motocross Association (WWBMXA) in Chatsworth, California in 1981. Unfortunately it did not last more than two racing seasons.

National Bicycle League (NBL)

The National Bicycle League (NBL), a nonprofit organization, was started in 1974 by George Edward Esser (September 17, 1925 – August 31, 2006). It was originally based in Pompano Beach, Florida, in the US, but ultimately moved its headquarters is located in Hilliard, Ohio. George Esser was exposed to BMX by his son Greg Esser, who was famous within the sport and one of the sport's earliest superstars and first professionals. Like Ernie Alexander and Scot Breithaupt before him, he was a promoter who created the NBL as the BMX auxiliary to the National Motorcycle League (NML), now-defunct, when he became dissatisfied with how the races were run.

The NBL expanded rapidly on the East Coast of the United States and for most of its early history it had only a few tracks west of the Mississippi River. That changed in 1982 when it inherited the membership and tracks of the defunct National Bicycle Association (NBA) which had ceased sanctioning its own races and went into partnership with the NBL. The NBL acquired all the NBA tracks in the nation including all those west of the Mississippi. As a result, it became a nation-spanning sanctioning body like the ABA.

In 1997 the NBL joined USA Cycling, a sanctioning body that has long supported road race, mountain biking and other cycling disciplines in the United States, tracing its roots back to 1920. The resulting organization was the National Federated body that represents cycling in the United States. USA Cycling is part of the Union Cycliste Internationale (UCI) also known as UCI Cycling, the Switzerland-based international governing body that oversees virtually all aspects of cycling around the world (see International Sanctioning bodies below).

The NBL had a previous association with the UCI through its affiliations with the defunct NBL sister organization, the International Bicycle Motocross Federation (IBMXF), which was also co-founded by Mr. Esser. The UCI absorbed IBMXF in 1993 through its amateur cycling division, Fédération Internationale Amateur de Cyclisme (FIAC), which in the prior five years held joint World Championships for BMX with the IBMXF (See International Sanctioning bodies below).

On May 17, 2011, the NBL announced that a letter of agreement was signed and approved by their Board of Directors, to merge operations with the ABA. The merged organization would be controlled by ABA ownership, and would be called USA BMX. After a month of negotiation between the parties, the final documents were signed on June 18, 2011. That day was the first time in more than 35 years that the sport of BMX Racing was run under a single sanctioning body in North America. The following week, the NBL Midwest National in Warsaw, Indiana was the first event to be run under the USA BMX banner (though was still an NBL-branded event, as part of their 2011 national series). The 2011 NBL Grand National was the final NBL race to be held, held September 3–4, 2011 and dubbed "The Grand Finale."

American Bicycle Association (ABA)

The American Bicycle Association (ABA), created by Gene Roden and Merl Mennenga in 1977, originated in Chandler, Arizona, USA. As the NBA was declining, the ABA inherited many of its tracks and members making the ABA (within two years) the largest and the first nation-spanning sanctioning body. It was the ABA which introduced the "Direct Transfer System" that shortened the duration of race events. The ABA also started the team trophy concept to award trophies and prizes to the bicycle shop and factory teams with the best race results over a season. It was also the first to install electronic gates for its starting line with "Christmas tree" style lights (reminiscent of drag racing), to ensure fair starts. The ABA also established the BMX Hall of Fame, now called the National BMX Hall of Fame, which recognizes the pioneers and industry visionaries of the sport.

It was the largest sanctioning body in the world (a position it won as early as 1979 when it surpassed the NBL and the old NBA in numbers) with an estimated 60,000 members and 272 affiliated tracks in the United States, Mexico, and Canada. It was technically an international organization, but did not bill itself as one, based on its mandate to grow BMX in the United States, unlike its predecessor, the International Bicycle Motocross Association (IBMX), and its chief early rival, the NBA, both of which had international aspirations.

The ABA brand was retired at the close of the 2011 season, becoming USA BMX as part of its merger with the rival National Bicycle League (NBL).

USA BMX

USA BMX was formed in 2011 from the merger of the ABA and NBL organizations (with ABA taking control), and is the current sanctioning body for BMX racing in the United States. USA BMX utilized mainly ABA rules, but incorporated aspects of the NBL. As the sport has grown in the United States and Internationally, BMX racing has evolved with new rules, classes, and competition. A consolidated governing body had become a necessity to solidify BMX racing as a recognized cycling sport both nationally and internationally. In the following years since USA BMX was formed, the ABA and NBL rivalry that once permeated BMX in the United States has been forgotten.

Other notable American sanctioning bodies

Along with the majors and pioneers, there were other BMX governing bodies, both national and regional. Among them were the Bicycle Motocross League (BMXL); the United Bicycle Racers Association (UBR) (1977–1983); the United States Bicycle Motocross Association (USBA) (1984–1986), which merged with the ABA at the end of the 1986 racing season after financial trouble made it unsustainable; the International Cycling Association (ICA), which was started in part by professional racer Greg Hill in 1990; and the Southeast Region-based National Pedal Sport Association (NPSA) (1975–1988). These organizations have all ceased to exist.

International sanctioning bodies

International Bicycle Motocross Federation (IBMXF)

The International Bicycle Motocross Federation (IBMXF) was founded on April 3, 1981, by Gerrit Does, a former motocross racer and Dutch citizen. He introduced BMX to the Netherlands in 1974 after seeing it in the United States. He also started the first European BMX sanctioning body the Stichting Fietscross Nederland (SFN) (the Dutch Bicycle Motocross Foundation (DBMXF) in English) in the Netherlands in 1978. George Esser, the same man who founded the American-based National Bicycle League (NBL) in 1974 was the co-founder of the IBMXF, after Mr. Does approached the NBL to begin preparations for the new body in December 1980 with the representatives of sanctioning bodies from Canada, Colombia, Japan, Panama, and Venezuela as well as representing his native the Netherlands. The IBMXF was a Waalre, the Netherlands-based body that conducted international events including its own World Championship event until its formal merger with the Union Cycliste Internationale (UCI) amateur cycling division the Fédération Internationale Amateur de Cyclisme (FIAC) in 1996 to form the largest international sanctioning body. The UCI championships have since superseded the old IBMXF championships and unlike the old FIAC BMX championships it has a pro class. The NBL was affiliated with the UCI through its previous ties with the IBMXF and its merger with the FIAC. 

In the old days of the IBMXF, when riders raced an IBMXF sanctioned race, they received NBL state points and points that went toward trheir international standing, but no national NBL points that counted toward contention for national number one plates. The World Championship title was open to 16 & over Experts and older amateurs in the 20" class as well as Pros in the 20" class. There is a class in European BMX called Superclass. In this class, which is ahead of Expert and the last step before going pro, amateurs race for and win money, an odd contradiction of the generally accepted definition of amateur. However, no racer in Superclass could win more than US$200 per event and keep their amateur standing. This class has been carried over in the UCI after the merger with the IBMXF. In the United States IBMXF affiliate the NBL, Superclass is the equivalent of the old "B" pro class and "A" pro is now called the Elite as per UCI practice. However, for the first few years the IBMXF while there was a pro class, the professionals did not race for money but trophies just like the amateurs and the prestige of being declared World Champions with its associate side benefits in marketing. It was not until 1987 did the pro race for award purses at the IBMXF World Championships.

Among the European standards of racing the IBMXF observed is the rule that racers must stay within their lanes until  out of the gate. This is to prevent racers from throwing elbows at each other and to eliminate major crashes before they even get to the first jump. However, on tracks with short straights those who must start from the outside lanes are at a serious disadvantage since they cannot begin moving inside to shorten the distance before the first turn. As a result, many races could be won or lose by lane assignment even before the race begins.

In the first year of the IBMXF World Championship in 1982 after having standard racers decide the World Champions in the various Classes, both Amateur and Professional, an overall World Champion was decided by racing all of the class winners including the Pro Champion and Amateur champion in a single race called the Trophy Dash. In 1982, Greg Hill, the professional World Champion refused to race the Amateur World Champion the American Nelson Chanady, claiming that there was no point to it. Nelson Chanady raced and won the Trophy Dash without Hill's participation, capturing the Overall title. However, since Mr. Hill did not race, the World Championship title lost a considerable amount of luster, since American professional racers were regarded collectively as the best in the world with Mr. Hill being among the best of them. Because of this loss of stature due to Mr. Hill not racing that final race in 1982, the Trophy Dash to determine the World Champion was abolished and in 1983 when the American professional Clint Miller won the World Professional Championship he was also considered the overall World Champion.

On January 1, 1993, the IBMXF and the Fédération Internationale Amateur de Cyclisme (FIAC), the amateur governing branch of the Union Cycliste Internationale (UCI) which handled Olympic Cycling, merged formally after having held joint World Championships since July 22, 1991 in Sandness, Norway (FIAC had been holding its own separate BMX World Championships starting 1986). After a further three year transition time in which the European and World Championships where credited as "IBMXF/FIAC" the UCI held its first official BMX World Championship in 1996 in England. It has continued to hold BMX European and World Championships ever since.

Fédération Internationale Amateur de Cyclisme (FIAC)

The Fédération Internationale Amateur de Cyclisme (FIAC) which in English stands for International Amateur Cycling Federation, which was based in Rome, Italy, was the amateur cycling arm of the UCI. It had direct ties to the International Olympic Committee (IOC). It had no professional division. That was the purview of its professional counterpart based in Luxembourg, the Fédération Internationale de Cyclisme Professionnel (FICP), also operated by the UCI. However, a class of paid amateurs called the Superclass is allowed even though it may contradict the accepted notions of what an amateur is. However, members of the Supercross class could not win more than US$200 per event and keep their amateur standing. In any case, with the allowance of professionals in the Olympics this has largely become a moot point. USA Cycling, formerly the United States Cycling Federation (USCF) as it was known at the time, was the American affiliate of FIAC. However, it did not have a BMX division at this time. The NBL worked through the then independent IBMXF. Today after purchasing the NBL USA Cycling the NBL represents BMX in the UCI through USA Cycling.

FIAC started holding its own BMX World Championships in 1984. At the time the IBMXF and FIAC were two separate International sanctioning bodies that both held BMX World Championships. However, the IBMXF's was far more prestigious, professionally competently run and established than FIAC. This was because FIAC refused help from either the IBMXF and the American for profit American Bicycle Association (then as now only one non-profit BMX sanctioning body per nation is recognized by the UCI as representing BMX in a nation. In the United States's case, it was and is the NBL), both far more experienced at the time in running BMX races. In some nations, if riders race in the IBMXF circuit (see above), they could not race in the FIAC circuit and vice versa, akin to not being allowed to race in NBL if they raced the ABA circuit, if they had such rules in America. FIAC had odd (to Americans) conventions and rules in conducting races, most likely grafted on from road racing in which was FIAC's only experience. For instance, racing three times to determine average positions in the motos to advance the best four riders to the next stage in racing, something Americans were familiar if they raced NBL. If the class was big enough, riders raced the eighths, quarters and semis, also three times, and the best racers qualified for the Main. Main qualifiers had to race the Main five times to find the final ranking of racers. In the US only the Professionals in the 20" class raced the Main multiple times and only three times at that in either the ABA or NBL. If anything this put a premium on consistency and lowered the luck factor to a bare minimum. However, it was very time-consuming, even at races scheduled over two days.

For a sanctioning body then new to BMX, it was pretty efficient in terms of running an event (taking into consideration the multiple qualifying runs). However, because of its inexperience it was plagued with tracks of inferior quality, both in terms of difficulty, they were deemed far too easy for venues of an international event; and the building materials used, for example during the 1988 Championships in Mol, Belgium the track was built out of white sand, which became particularly boggy in the turns. "It feels like riding on the beach"  was a refrain from many American racers. This inexperience of track construction was rectified by 1991 when the FIAC and the IBMXF started holding combined World Championship series in 1991 after four years of holding separate championship events. The two bodies formally unified in 1993 (FICP was disbanded along with the FIAC by the UCI). After a three-year transition period, The UCI held its first World Championship in 1996 after absorbing the IBMXF and abolishing FIAC. With the increasing relaxation of the rules of Professionalism in the IOC, the merged governing body, run directly by the UCI, retained the professional division.

Union Cycliste Internationale (UCI)

The Union Cycliste Internationale (UCI) or in English the International Cycling Union, is a Switzerland-based international sanctioning body created in 1900 which has had its own international BMX racing program since 1982 (through FIAC) and have been holding World Championships for BMX racing since 1996. The UCI also supports Mountain Bike, Track, Road Race Cycling, and Cyclo-Cross. The UCI through its amateur division FIAC, held championships were separate and distinct from the International Bicycle Motocross Federation (IBMXF) World Championships until they started to hold the World Championships jointly starting in 1991 (see above). The American sanctioning body the National Bicycle League (NBL) was affiliated with the UCI via the old IBMXF which the NBL was a part of. With the merger of the IBMXF with FIAC, they in turn being folded into the UCI, and the NBL joining the USA Cycling directly, the NBL was affiliated with the UCI from 1996 to 2008. Beginning with the 2009 season, the ABA (USA BMX after 2011) took over as the USA affiliate of UCI.

General rules of advancement in organized BMX racing
To advance a racer must win 10 races as a Novice to advance to Intermediate. Upon winning 20 races (or 10 as a girl) in the Intermediate class the rider will move to Expert, the highest non-Pro class. Boys and girls are combined and race together in Novice and Intermediate classes; at the Expert level boys and girls are separated into Expert and Girls Expert. Any rider can request to be moved into a different class (typically to advance) regardless of number of wins, but upon doing so the rider cannot reclass again or return to their former class for one year. Cruiser and Girls Cruiser have no advancement and are only separated by age.

Skill levels, race structure, qualifying methods, awards
For North Americans racing with USA BMX (or affiliate BMX Canada) racers in the 20" class are grouped with others of the same relative age and experience levels; Novice, Intermediate, Expert, Girls Expert, Vet Pro, Men/Women Junior, and Men/Women Pro. The Veteran, "A" Pro, "AA" Pro, Rookie, Elite Masters, "B" Pro (Superclass) and "A" Pro (Elite) classes were retired or renamed upon either the 2011 ABA-NBL merger or prior to the 2021 BMX racing season. Cruiser classes are not divided into skill classes, only age classes.

The UCI structure is divided by age classes and lacks the skill levels such as novice and intermediate; rather 7 year-olds will ride with 7 year-olds regardless of experience level. 

There are two main types of races; the Transfer System, and the Total Points System.

In a Transfer System race the racer will ride in qualifying rounds, called motos (called heats in other types of racing) to determine the number of racers in the finals which are called Mains. The sizes and number of motos at a skill level and age group is determined by the number of racers who register for that race and in their respective skill level and age group. Usually a racer gets two chances (sometimes three) to qualify. In a transfer race the top finishers in the qualifying motos are transferred directly to the Main depending on the size of the class. The last place racers do not qualify (DNQ) and therefore do not race in the Main; they do not collect any points or awards, or if they are professionals, prize money.

In the "Olympic" or Total Points System a racer must race all three times and is scored on their respective places for the three motos. The scoring formula combines how well a rider does with all the registered participant riders in their class while racing all three times. The higher the points total, the more likely a racer will advance to a semi-final, or final if one is being run.

The Transfer System was used by the former ABA and the Total Points System was used by the former NBL. Currently the UCI, and Olympics, use the Total Points System. USA BMX allows the use of both systems depending on the racing event and track operator's discretion. Races such as Gold Cup, State, or National continue to use the Transfer System.

Local Points Awards and District Ranking
The racer's home state/province may be divided up into several districts depending how many participants and how spread out they are over the state/province.

Riders are awarded points depending on their respective finish in the race, which are added to their cumulative totals, and ultimately determining district rankings at the end of the calendar year. The number of points a racer gets after a race is determined by his place in the Main in a Transfer Race, or overall score in a Total Points race. The skill level class also determines how many points are awarded. First place in an Expert class will get 100 points while the first place Intermediate will get 50 points; and the first place Novice gets 25 points. Second, third et al. placers get lower points in proportion.

In all classes and skill levels racers also receive points depending on how many are in their class and age group. These are called participant points. For instance if eight riders participate, all those in that race will get 8 points added to their placing points.

There are separate point scoring for cruiser classes, and separate point tables for state and national rankings.

National and special event points awards
Other important factors affect the point totals. Some local special event races are double or even triple point races, doubling or tripling the points each position in the Mains each racer would normally get. points are awarded, so an Expert winner could look forward to collecting 400 points for winning his class in addition to bonus points and participant points.

To compete on a National level for national titles, a racer must compete in Nationals. Nationals have their own separate points tables that are accumulated by the racers similarly to local district points. However the points rewarded are not the same amount. For instance 240 National points are awarded to the first place Expert winner as well as his 300 district triple points, but his national points are not added to his district points or vice versa. Like in local races he or she is also awarded participant points. The amateur with the most National points at the end of the year is the overall National number one (#1) racer and gets to wear a #1 on his number plate at national events the following season. Professionals are not affected since they have their own points system and table separate from the amateurs for the number one pro title.

In the NBL there is no overall #1 amateur, only a number one title for their age group, so a racer in say 17 expert that has most points can wear a national #1 plate even if the number one rider in 12 expert actually has more points. Again, the professionals have their own points system for number one pro.

There is yet another points table for State/Provincial wide events for the State/Provincial Championship. However, instead of wide gap points between winners and those who follow and between skill levels, they are quite close i.e. for first place in Expert, Intermediate and Novice it is 20, 19, and 18 respectively. Also, it is only a one-point difference between places i.e. 20 points for first and 19 points for second place in Expert. The same for the Novice and Intermediate levels. Also unlike on the National and District level no participant points are awarded.

In the NBL, the points received for moto points in the cumulative "Olympic" system at the national and regional level are similar as on the district level.

Nationals can also affect a skill level ranking. On the local level it takes eight career wins to transfer from Novice to Intermediate; from Intermediate to Expert 25 career wins are necessary. On the national level only five career wins are required in both cases. This is because of the much higher quality of competition found on the national level.

All of the aforementioned applies with minor variations to the Girls and Cruiser Classes.

Open and trophy dash events
A fourth class of racing in BMX which are held at local and national events are called Opens. Opens are largely exhibition and are a chance for riders to test themselves and practice against better competition without jeopardizing their point standings. They must be registered to race in a points race to sign up for the Open events. No points are awarded for Opens although trophy places are and the moto qualification rounds are similar to the point races. These are races with more flexible skill level and age requirements. In Opens there are no Novice, Intermediate and Expert divisions. All amateur skill levels are free to participate. The age groupings are generally broader, for example 13-14 open class as opposed to 13 Intermediate and 14 Intermediate being separate groupings for those ages in the points races. Girls may also participate in the male Open class within the proper age ranges. However expert boys are not allowed in these "Mixed" opens. Then an Expert Open is held in that event. The pros are excluded from racing with the amateurs if enough pros are at hand to race that a separate Pro-Open class can be created. If not, then the pros can race in the amateur Open with some restrictions. This is called a Pro-Am event. Except for the Pro-Am exception the Expert racers usually wins the open class. Even if there are Pros in the Open, it is not unusual for an older Expert-17-18 age class for example-to win since many have the talent and speed to be a pro but have not yet taken the opportunity, partly because once a rider goes Pro, they can go back to amateur only under very strict circumstances.

There are separate Open divisions for Cruisers where similar rules apply.

Sometimes an exhibition race is held after all the meaningful races are run with all the amateur class winners from Novice up to Expert and including the Open, girls classes and perhaps Cruiser classes race together once. This is called the Trophy Dash. Like in the Open Classes, no points are rewarded in this case, just a chance for bragging rights and for racers to match themselves up against people who are at a higher skill level. Only one race for a single first-place trophy is awarded. As in the Opens the Expert usually wins with the Intermediate winner pulling one out every once in a while. Novices usually win only when a major, catastrophic pile up occurs on the track and even then the mass smash up has to happen quite close to the finish line.

Professionals
There are professional rankings in BMX. In the ABA the two major ones are the "A" and "AA" classifications in the 20" division. The Professionals are the only class allowed to compete for cash prizes.

The first level is pro. To become an "A" pro, a rider has to hold at least an Expert skill level rating and be at least 16 years old to be issued a Pro Membership card by USA BMX. A professional BMXer with another BMX sanctioning body will be recognized as a Pro by USA BMX and barred from competing in ABA sanctioned amateur classes. Once becoming a pro BMX racer, a pro cannot go back to amateur status, except under stringent circumstances. What's more, by turning BMX Pro, a rider will very likely be disqualifying themselves from other amateur sports, depending on the state and federal laws that apply.

In recent years, A Pros decide when they want to move to up to AA Pro. There used to be a $3,000 winnings cap, however, this was removed in 2015.

"A" pro and "AA" pros race in separate classes generally, but if there are too few of one or the other type of pro to race separately-four is the minimum-then they race together in a combined class. This occurs generally in at large multi-point local district races but usually not at Nationals.

Pro ranking points are similar to the National amateur points awards. "A" Pros get the equivalent of National Intermediate points. i.e. 120 for first, 100 points for second etc. "AA" Pro get Expert equivalent points i.e. 240 for first etc. Both like in the amateur classes get participant points if the racer makes the Main. The person with the most points in a season will be District Pro #1, the same is true to become state Pro #1. However, on the national level, not only must racers receive the most points, they must race in at least 10 nationals plus the Grand Nationals, the ABA's multi-day season ending even. The best 10 finishes will go toward national rankings. For example, if a rider participates in 13 national events, their best 10 will be considered and their worst three disregarded. This qualification must be met on the national level to wear National numbers one through ten on the number plate the following year.

The rules are similar for Pro Cruiser and Pro Girls classes.

There is a fourth class of pro called Veteran Pro. These are professionals in the 20" class that are at least 30 years old and generally past their racing prime but still love to compete. Most of the rules that apply to the "A" and "AA" pros apply to the "Vet" Pros except that they are required to race in only six national events plus the Grand Nationals and are classified as "A" Pros and get "A" Pro points, However, they can win unlimited prize money as a Vet pro on this "A" Pro level without the requirement of moving up to "AA" pro upon winning US$3000 in a season. Some Vet Pros are retired "AA" pros that have come back to the sport. In those cases they had to go through a reclassification process with certain criteria having to be met, including written permission from conventional "A" Pros. "Vet" Pros cannot compete for the National #1 Championship.

For the 2021 racing season, USA BMX Pro Series races will now offer 3 categories of professional racing. Men Pro, Women Pro, and Vet Pro (minimum age of 30). Revised age requirement: Riders can now participate in the Pro class at the age of 17.

Examples of notable BMX racers

Many participants in BMX racing have left their mark. Most are pure racers while some promoted and sponsored races; others have created unique maneuvers and invented or helped design equipment as well have raced themselves. They have done it over the near 40-year history of the sport during distinct eras. These are just a few.

Pioneering "Old School"* BMX racers from the US include:

Scot Breithaupt
David Clinton
John George
Bobby Encinas
Tinker Juarez
Perry Kramer
Stu Thomsen
Jeff Bottema
Jeff Kosmala
Jeff Ruminer
Scott Clark
Frank Post
Anthony Sewell
Brent Patterson
Brian Patterson
Harry Leary
Tommy Brackens
Eric Rupe
Pete Loncarevich
Greg Hill
Cheri Elliott
Richie Anderson
Debbie Kalsow
Clint Miller
Donny Atherton
Darrell Young
Andy Patterson
Eddy King
Mike King
Gary Ellis
Deanna Edwards
Tim Judge
Mike Miranda
Lee Medlin
Shawn Texas
Nelson Chanady
Mike Poulson
Toby Henderson
Shelby James
D.D. Leone

Each racer is sourced on his/her individual page.
US "Mid school" racers and racers whose careers started during the "Old School" era but were not part of the pioneering 1970's generation include:

Charles Townsend
Terry Tenette
Darwin Griffin
Eric Carter
Billy Griggs
Steve Veltman
John Purse
Kiyomi Waller
Melanie Cline
Kenny May
Danny Nelson
Matt Hadan
Cindy Davis
Alan Foster
Brian Foster
Gary DeBacker
Tara Llanes
Robert MacPherson

Each racer is sourced on his/her individual page.
Notable international Old and "Mid School"* BMX racers:

Corine Dorland Netherlands
Thomas Allier France
Kelvin Batey Ireland
Bas de Bever Netherlands
Christophe Lévêque France
Dale Holmes UK
Anne-Caroline Chausson France

Each racer is sourced on his/her individual page.
Newer "Mid School" and "New/Current School"* racers include:

Mariana Pajón Colombia
Jamie Lilly US
Bubba Harris US
Wade Bootes Australia
Kim Hayashi US
Shanaze Reade UK
Randy Stumpfhauser US
Samantha Cools Canada
Willy Kanis Netherlands
Donny Robinson US
Kyle Bennett US
Warwick Stevenson Australia
Robert de Wilde Netherlands
Alice Jung US
Joey Bradford US
Laëtitia Le Corguillé France
Jill Kintner US
Māris Štrombergs Latvia
Mike Day US
Carlos Ramírez Colombia
Alise Post US

Each racer is sourced on his/her individual page.

*Generally speaking the "Old School" generation is from 1969, the very beginning of BMX to 1987 or 1988, during the first major slump in the popularity of BMX racing and the height of popularity of Old School Freestyling. "Mid School" is generally considered to be from 1988 to 1999, which includes the first slump in Freestyle BMX in 1988-89 and the resurgence of BMX racing beginning in 1990 and it really taking off again in 1993. "New/Current School" or today's BMX is considered to be from 2000 to the present day with the emphasis on Dirt Jumping contests and streetstyle and deemphasis on racing. With the racers, it will not be perfect demarcations. Some Old Schoolers raced well into the Mid School era of the 1990s, like Pete Loncarevich and Greg Hill. There are a few Old Schoolers still racing in the Veteran and Masters classes today, Eric Rupe to name one. Many Mid Schoolers like Warwick Stevenson and Randy Stumpfhauser are racing well into the New/Current School era. A significant number of top New Schoolers started during the "Mid school" era like Donny Robinson and Bubba Harris, so there is bleed over. As time goes by the year definitions of eras of "Mid" and "New School" will change, especially Mid School, but "Old School" will most likely always refer to the sports first 18–19 years when the pioneers began it, set the rules, promoted it, constructed the precedent setting equipment, set the records and conventions, raced it, and largely retired from it in terms of serious Senior Pro competition.

National American sanctioning body number one racers by year

National Bicycle Association (NBA)

CDNE=Class did not exist. TDNE=Title did not exist.

Note: Dates reflect the year the racers *won* their plates, not the year they actually *raced* their No.1 plates. In other words, David Clinton won his No.1 plate in 1974 entitling him to race with #1 on his plate for the 1975 season. John George then won the No.1 plate in 1975 and raced with #1 on his plate during the 1976 racing season.

Pro* Nat.#1 Men

1974 David Clinton*
1975 John George*
1976 Scot Breithaupt**
1977 Stu Thomsen
1978 Stu Thomsen
1979 Scott Clark
1980 Anthony Sewell
1981 Scott Clark

Pro Cruiser Nat.#1 Men

1980 Jeff Kosmala
1981 Turnell Henry

Amat. Nat.#1 Men

1974 David Clinton*
1975 John George*
1976 Scot Breithaupt**
1977 Stu Thomsen***
1978 Stu Thomsen***
1979 Greg Hill****
1980 Donny Atherton
1981 Keith Gaynor

Amat. Nat.#1 Powder Puff

1974
1975
1976
1977
1978
1979 Debbie Shobert
1980
1981

*The NBA did not have a true National no.1 until 1975 when the first true national was held. Until then No.1s were strictly district. However, since the NBA Southern California District was the largest by far in the country during those years (indeed, only in Arizona did the NBA have any districts outside of California) and John George in 1975 and before him David Clinton in 1974 where the district champions at the end of those seasons that made them National No.1s by default. In the case of David Clinton in 1974 almost no tracks existed outside of California and none of those were NBA sanctioned.
**The NBA did have a separate professional division beginning in 1976, but until 1979 the National No.1 plate was all around for every class pro or amateur.

***The Number One pro title did not exist until 1979.

****NBA Pros were allowed to race in the Amateur class and hold the amateur title at the time, so Greg Hill, while a professional was eligible for and won the no. 1 Amateur title.

National Bicycle League (NBL)

Note: Dates reflect the year the racers *won* their plates, not the year they actually *raced* their No.1 plates. In other words, Antony Sewell won his No.1 plate in 1980 entitling him to race with #1 on his plate for the 1981 season. Stu Thomsen then won the No.1 plate in 1981 and raced with #1 on his plate during the 1982 racing season.

Elite ("AA") Pro Nat.#1 

1978 Sal Zeuner**
1979 Greg Esser**
1980 Anthony Sewell
1981 Stu Thomsen
1982 Stu Thomsen
1983 Eric Rupe
1984 Eric Rupe
1985 Greg Hill
1986 Pete Loncarevich
1987 Pete Loncarevich
1988 Greg Hill
1989 Gary Ellis
1990 Terry Tenette
1991 Terry Tenette
1992 Terry Tenette
1993 Eric Carter
1994 Gary Ellis
1995 John Purse
1996 John Purse
1997 Christophe Lévêque
1998 Christophe Lévêque
1999 Danny Nelson
2000 Thomas Allier
2001 Jamie Staff
2002 Kyle Bennett
2003 Randy Stumpfhauser
2004 Kyle Bennett
2005 Mike Day
2006 Donny Robinson
2007 Kyle Bennett
2008 Randy Stumpfhauser
2009 Maris Strombergs
2010 Maris Strombergs
2011 ----

Pro Nat.#1 (Elite) Cruiser

1981 Brent Patterson
1982 Brent Patterson
1983 Brent Patterson
1984 Toby Henderson
1985 Greg Hill
1986 Greg Hill
1987 Eric Rupe
1988 Eric Rupe
1989 Ron Walker
1990 Kenny May
1991 Barry McManus
1992 Barry McManus
1993
1994 Justin Green
1995
1996 Billy Au
1997 Kiyomi Waller
1998 Randy Stumpfhauser
1999 Dale Holmes
2000 Kevin Tomko
2001 Randy Stumpfhauser
2002 Randy Stumpfhauser
2003 Randy Stumpfhauser
2004 Randy Stumpfhauser
2005 Donny Robinson
2006 TD****
2007 TD
2008 TD
2009 TD
2010 TD
2011 ----

"A" Pro/Super-EX Nat.#1 

1981 TDNE***
1982 TDNE
1983 TDNE
1984 TDNE
1985 TDNE
1986 TDNE
1987 TDNE
1988 TDNE
1989 TDNE
1990 Darrin Waterbury
1991 Barry McManus
1992 Brian Foster
1993
1994
1995
1996
1997 Jeff Dein
1998 Steven Spahr
1999 Todd Lyons
2000 Eric Rupe
2001
2002 Jonathan Suarez
2003 Derek Betcher
2004 Augusto Castro
2005 Derek Betcher
2006 TD****
2007 TD
2008 Carlos Oquendo
2009 Josh Meyers
2010 Josh Meyers
2011 ----

"A" Pro Cruiser Nat.#1 

1998
1999
2000
2001
2002 Eric Rupe
2003 Jason Carnes
2004
2005
2006
2007 TD****
2008 TD
2009 TD
2010 TD
2011 ----

Pro Nat. #1 Masters

1997
1998
1999
2000 Eric Rupe
2001
2002 Derek Betcher
2003
2004 Eric Rupe
2005 Dave Bittner
2006 Kiyomi Waller
2007
2008 Dale Holmes
2009 Dale Holmes
2010 Dale Holmes
2011 ----

Amateur & Elite Pro Nat.#1 Women

1980 Heidi Mirisola(Am)†
1981 Kathy Schachel(Am)
1982 Kathy Schachel(Am)
1983 Kathy Schachel(Am)
1984 Debbie Kalsow(Am)
1985 Kathy Schachel(Pro)
1986 Kathy Schachel(Pro)
1987 Gaby Bayhi(Pro)
1988 Stacey Lupfer(Am)
1989 Jennifer Wardle(Am)
1990 Christy Homa(Am)
1991 Melanie Cline(Am)
1992 Marie McGilvary(Am)
1993 Michelle Cairns(Am)
1994 Marie McGilvary(Am)
1995 Marie McGilvary(Am)
1996 Marie McGilvary(Sup)‡
1997 Michelle Cairns
1998 Michelle Cairns
1999 Marie McGilvar
2000 Natarsha Williams
2001 Natarsha Williams
2002 Jill Kintner
2003 Kim Hayashi
2004 Kim Hayashi
2005 Kim Hayashi
2006 Kim Hayashi
2007 Kim Hayashi
2008 Stephanie Barragan
2009 Dominique Daniels
2010 Dominique Daniels
2011 ----

Am Nat.#1 Girls Cruiser

1991 Michelle Cairns
1992
1993
1994
1995
1996
1997
1998
1999
2000
2001
2002
2003
2004
2005
2006
2007
2008 TD****
2009 TD
2010 TD
2011 ----

*Class Did Not Exist

**Until the 1980 season the #1 plate holder was considered #1 overall amateur or professional. The NBL did have a pro class in 1977, 1978 & 1979 but the title of National Number One Professional was not created until the 1980 season when the pros and the 16 Experts were separated and the pros earning separate points (in the form of purse money won) from the amateurs. Prior to 1980 the pros, due to the comparatively small number of them, competed with the 16 Experts and were able to earn amateur titles.

***Title Did Not Exist The title plate for this class did exist under the title of "B" pro (which was created for the 1981 season), but it was not until 1990 when the name was changed to "Superclass" and it became a pro/am class were the racers of that class given an opportunity to win a separate year end overall National #1 plate title separate from the pure Pro and the pure amateur classes. Amateurs competed for prizes and Pros could compete for a limited amount purses. Also beginning in the 1990 season "Pro Cruiser" was renamed "Super Cruiser" and "A" Pro "All Pro". In 1996 Super Cruiser was renamed "Pro Cruiser" once again and "All" Pro reverted to "Pro Class" This was to harmonize NBL nomenclature with UCI/IBMXF labels. Because of this the NBL would change the name of its pro Classes many times during the 1990s, They even began calling there senior pro class "AA" and the junior pros "A" just like the ABA beginning in the year 2000. Continuing the name shuffle the senior male pro class was officially known as Elite Men and the junior men "A" pro until the end of the 2006 season. Beginning with the 2007 season the junior "A" pro class was called "Super X" (SX). The single level pro females are called Elite Women. Beginning with the 2006 season the NBL ceased offering an independent year end title for both the "A" pro class and the Pro Cruisers. In the case of Pro Cruiser it was an end of a long era with the Pro Cruiser No.1 title going back to 1981 when Brent Patterson first won the class. In 2007 the junior pro class was rechristened "Super X" and an independent year end number one plate was reestablished.

****Title Discontinued

†(AM)=Amateur. From 1981 to 1984 the girl's National No.1 title was amateur. Between 1985 and 1987 a girl's pro class was established but that division was discontinued between 1988 and 1996 due to lack of participants and those National No.1 women titles were again amateurs. From 1997 to the present the title is a professional one once again.
‡(Sup)=Superclass. Superclass was a Pro/Am class.

American Bicycle Association (ABA)

Note: Dates reflect the year the racers *won* their plates, not the year they actually *raced* their No.1 plates. In other words, Stu Thomsen won his No.1 title in 1979 entitling him to race with #1 on his plate for the 1980 season. Brent Patterson then won the No.1 plate in 1980 and raced with #1 on his plate during the 1981 racing season.

Pro Nat.#1 Men (AA)

1977 Title did not exist*
1978 Title did not exist*
1979 Stu Thomsen
1980 Brent Patterson
1981 Kevin McNeal
1982 Brian Patterson
1983 Brian Patterson
1984 Pete Loncarevich
1985 Ronnie Anderson
1986 Pete Loncarevich
1987 Charles Townsend
1988 Mike King
1989 Gary Ellis
1990 Gary Ellis
1991 Pete Loncarevich
1992 Pete Loncarevich
1993 Steve Veltman
1994 Gary Ellis
1995 Gary Ellis
1996 Robert MacPherson
1997 John Purse
1998 Christophe Lévêque
1999 Christophe Lévêque
2000 Wade Bootes
2001 Warwick Stevenson
2002 Danny Nelson
2003 Warwick Stevenson
2004 Bubba Harris
2005 Bubba Harris
2006 Bubba Harris
2007 Danny Caluag
2008 Khalen Young
2009 Randy Stumpfhauser
2010 Sam Willoughby
2011 ----

Pro Nat.#1 Cruiser Men 

 Title did not exist**
 TDNE
 TDNE
 TDNE
 TDNE
 TDNE
 Eric Rupe
 Eric Rupe
 Hans Nissen
 Kenny May
 Kenny May
 Darrell Young
 Terry Tenette
 Justin Green
 Kiyomi Waller
 Wade Bootes
 Kiyomi Waller
 Kiyomi Waller
 Dale Holmes
 Andy Contes
 Randy Stumpfhauser
 Randy Stumpfhauser
 Randy Stumpfhauser
 Randy Stumpfhauser
 Randy Stumpfhauser
 Donny Robinson
 Danny Caluag
 Danny Caluag
 Danny Caluag
 Barry Nobles
 ----

Veteran Pro Nat.#1 Men 

 1993 Harry Leary
 1994 Harry Leary
 1995 Eric Rupe
 1996 Eric Rupe
 1997 Eric Rupe
 1998 Eric Rupe
 1999 Eric Rupe
 2000 Eric Rupe
 2001 Eric Rupe
 2002 Jason Carnes
 2003 Jason Carnes
 2004 Jason Carnes
 2005 Jason Carnes
 2006 Jason Carnes
 2007 Jason Carnes
 2008 Kenth Fallen
 2009 Kenth Fallen
 2010 Kenth Fallen
 2011 ----

 Pro Nat.#1 Women 

 CDNE
 CDNE
 CDNE
 CDNE
 CDNE
 CDNE
 CDNE
 CDNE
 CDNE
 CDNE
 CDNE
 CDNE
 CDNE
 CDNE
 CDNE
 CDNE
 CDNE
 CDNE
 CDNE
 CDNE
 CDNE
 Heather Bruns
 Michelle Cairns
 Jamie Lilly
 Alice Jung
 Alice Jung
 Jamie Lilly
 Samantha Cools
 Samantha Cools
 Alise Post
 Alise Post
 Dominique Daniels
 Dominique Daniels
 Dominique Daniels
 ----

Am. Nat.#1 Men

 1977 Title did not exist
 1978 Kyle Fleming
 1979 Richie Anderson
 1980 Richie Anderson
 1981 Jason Wharton
 1982 Steve Veltman
 1983 Doug Davis
 1984 Mike King
 1985 Brent Romero
 1986 Eric Carter
 1987 Mike King
 1988 Kenny May
 1989 Marty Christman
 1990 David Milham
 1991 Zack Roebuck
 1992 Alexis Vergara
 1993 Adam McGuire
 1994 Kevin Royal
 1995 Robert MacPherson
 1996 Matt Ortwein
 1997 Brandon Meadows
 1998 Andy Contes
 1999 Brandon Nicholls
 2000 Ian Stoffel
 2001 Wes Jones
 2002 Sean Lechner
 2003 Josh Oie
 2004 Josh Oie
 2005 David Herman
 2006 David Herman
 2007 Nic Long
 2008 Nic Long
 2009 Corben Sharrah
 2010 Joshua Klatman
 2011 Joshua Klatman

Am. Nat.#1 Cruiser Men

 CDNE
 CDNE
 CDNE
 Jeff Kosmala
 Joe Claveau
 Steve Veltman
 Brett Allen
 Jason Johnson
 Shawn Callihan
 Matt Hadan
 Darwin Griffin
 Kenny May
 Shelby James
 Justin Green
 In Hee Lee
 In Hee Lee
 Anthony Freeman
 Larry Miersch
 Randy Stumpfhauser
 Barry Nilson
 Barry Nilson
 Barry Nilson
 Barry Nilson
 Wes Jones
 Jarret Kolich
 Mike Ellis
 Kirk Chrisco
 Terrel Proctor
 Robert O'Gorman
 Chris Verhagen
 Anthony Russell
 Corey Cook
 George Goodall
 Brodie Spott
 ----

Am. Nat.#1 Women 

 1982 Debbie Kalsow
 1983 Cheri Elliott
 1984 Cheri Elliott
 1985 Cheri Elliott
 1986 Dianna Bowling
 1987 Nikki Murray
 1988 Cindy Davis
 1989 Mapuana Naki
 1990 Tammy Daugherty
 1991 Marla Brady
 1992 Betsy Edmunson
 1993 Shara Wilson
 1994 Ashley Recklau
 1995 Cindy Davis
 1996 Ashley Recklau
 1997 Ashley Recklau
 1998 Jessica Cisar
 1999 Brooke Elder
 2000 Brooke Elder
 2001 Alise Post
 2002 Terra Nichols
 2003 Terra Nichols
 2004 Alise Post
 2005 Tyler Schaefer
 2006 Shelby Long
 2007 Dominique Daniels
 2008 Jordan Nopens
 2009 Jordan Nopens
 2010 Tyler Schaeffer
 2011 ----

Am. Nat.#1 Cruiser Women 

 CDNE
 CDNE
 CDNE
 CDNE
 CDNE
 CDNE
 CDNE
 CDNE
 CDNE
 CDNE
 Leigh Donovan
 Leigh Donovan
 Dianna Bowling
 Stephanie Anderson
 Cindy Davis
 Sheila Songcuan
 Cindy Davis
 Cindy Davis
 Darcey Cobb
 Ashley Recklau
 Anna Appleby
 Ashley Recklau
 Ashley Recklau
 Kim Hayashi
 Kim Hayashi
 Mailani Mcnabb
 Alise Post
 Alise Post
 Samantha Bretheim
 Tyler Schaefer
 Dominique Daniels
 Felicia Stancil
 Carly Dyar
 Kelsey Van Ogle
 ----

*Until the 1979 season the #1 plate holder was considered #1 overall amateur or professional. The ABA did have a pro class in 1977 & 1978 but the title of National Number One Professional was not created until the 1979 season when the pros and the 16 Experts were separated and the pros earning separate points (in the form of purse money won) from the amateurs. Prior to 1979 the pros, due to the comparatively small number of them, competed with the 16 Experts and were able to earn amateur titles.

**Title Did Not Exist. While the ABA did start its pro cruiser class in 1981 the title pro cruiser National Number One did not exist until 1987.

See also

Keirin

References

External links

 

BMX
Cycle racing by discipline
Summer Olympic disciplines